Saved is an American medical drama television series, which was broadcast on TNT from June 12 to September 4, 2006. The series was created by David Manson.

The series was premiered on June 12, 2006. The pilot episode, "A Day in the Life", received 5.1 million viewers. The Hollywood Reporter was the first to report that Saved would not be renewed by TNT, followed by various other sources, contradicting reports by the Internet Movie Database that Saved season 2 would begin on TNT with the episode "Epidemic" on March 5, 2007.

Plot 
Saved tells the story of Wyatt Cole, a Portland, Oregon, paramedic with a rough past and a history of compulsive gambling. The series follows the ups and downs of Cole's life, from the adrenaline rush he receives from his busy 24-hour shift to the chaotic personal decisions he makes.

Cast
 Tom Everett Scott as Wyatt Cole
 Omari Hardwick as John "Sack" Hallon
 Elizabeth Reaser as Alice Alden, M.D.
 Tracy Vilar as Angela De La Cruz
 Michael McMillian as Harper Sims

Music 
The show does not have an opening theme, usually only displaying the show logo briefly a few seconds after the show starts. The rock-oriented soundtrack accompanying the show, music supervised by Gary Calamar, has been well received by critics.

Songs featured in TV spots 
The Who – Baba O'Riley
Queen featuring David Bowie – Under Pressure
The Fray – How to Save a Life
Mat Kearney – Nothing to Lose

Episodes

References

External links
 
 

2000s American drama television series
2006 American television series debuts
2006 American television series endings
TNT (American TV network) original programming
English-language television shows
2000s American medical television series
Television series by 20th Century Fox Television
Television shows set in Oregon
Television shows set in Portland, Oregon
Television series by Imagine Entertainment